James Jones (December 11, 1772 – April 25, 1848) was a medical doctor, Virginia legislator, and U.S. Representative from Virginia.

Early life
Born in Nottoway Parish, Amelia (now Nottoway) County, Virginia, Jones graduated from Hampden–Sydney College in 1791, and the Jefferson Medical College, Philadelphia, Pennsylvania.  He earned a degree in medicine from the University of Edinburgh Medical School in Scotland in 1796.  He returned to Amelia County, where he practiced medicine and also engaged in agricultural pursuits.

Political career
Jones served as member of the Virginia House of Delegates from 1804 to 1809, and as privy councilor of Virginia from 1809 to 1811, when he resigned.  He served in the War of 1812 as director general of hospital and medical stores.  He returned to the Virginia House of Delegates in 1818.

He was an unsuccessful candidate for election to the Fifteenth Congress to fill the vacancy caused by the death of Peterson Goodwyn, but was elected as a Democratic-Republican to the Sixteenth and Seventeenth Congresses (March 4, 1819 – March 3, 1823).

Jones again became a member of the Virginia House of Delegates from 1827 to 1829, and subsequently resumed agricultural pursuits.  He died at his home, "Mountain Hall," near Nottoway, Virginia, April 25, 1848.  He was interred in the family burying ground on his estate.

Sources

1772 births
1848 deaths
People from Nottoway County, Virginia
Hampden–Sydney College alumni
Members of the Virginia House of Delegates
People from Virginia in the War of 1812
Alumni of the University of Edinburgh
Democratic-Republican Party members of the United States House of Representatives from Virginia
Burials in Virginia